The High Commission of Seychelles in London is the diplomatic mission of Seychelles in the United Kingdom. Unlike most embassies there is no flag or plaque indicating its existence.

References

External links

Seychelles
Diplomatic missions of Seychelles
Seychelles–United Kingdom relations
Buildings and structures in the City of Westminster
Victoria, London